The George Pardee House is a single-family home located at 603 North Ball Street in Owosso, Michigan. It was listed on the National Register of Historic Places in 1980.

History
George Pardee was one of Owosso's most successful lawyers. In 1906, he contracted local builder T. H. Bouser to build this home.

Description
The Pardee House is an eclectic Romanesque Revival-inspired building with an elaborately gabled roofline. The facade is of rough-faced poured concrete block with heavy stone lintels and bandcourses. The massive front porch has Ionic columns and a rounded arch entryway. On one corner of the house is a five-sided, three story tower. The gable ends are deeply recessed, and contain classically-inspired Palladian windows. Other windows in the face contain leaded glass diamond insets.

References

National Register of Historic Places in Shiawassee County, Michigan
Houses completed in 1906
1906 establishments in Michigan